A battlefield is the location of a present or historic battle involving ground warfare.

Battlefield may also refer to:

Geography
 Battlefield, Glasgow, Scotland
 Battlefield, Missouri, United States
 Battlefield, Shropshire, England
 Battlefields, Zimbabwe

Arts, entertainment, and media

Music
 Battlefield (album), an album by Jordin Sparks
"Battlefield" (song) by Jordin Sparks
"Battlefield", a 1991 song by Diana Ross from The Force Behind the Power
 "Battlefield", a song by Blind Guardian from A Night at the Opera
 Battlefield Band, a Scottish traditional music group

Other uses in arts, entertainment, and media
 Battlefield (Doctor Who), a 1989 Doctor Who serial
 Battlefield (play), a 2015 play
 Battlefield (professional wrestling), a 1994 professional wrestling event
 Battlefield (American TV series), an American documentary series that explores battles of World War II and Vietnam that aired on PBS from 1994 to 2002
 Battlefield (video game series), a video game franchise developed by Digital Illusions CE and published by Electronic Arts
 The Battlefield, a 1985 Hong Kong television drama series
Battlefield, a recurring stage featured in the Super Smash Bros. series.

See also
 Battle (disambiguation)
 Battleground (disambiguation)
 Battlespace
 National Military Park